Judge Voorhees may refer to:

Donald S. Voorhees (1916–1989), judge of the United States District Court for the Western District of Washington
Richard Lesley Voorhees (born 1941), judge of the United States District Court for the Western District of North Carolina

See also
Justice Voorhies (disambiguation)